A list of films produced in Argentina in 2007:

See also
2007 in Argentina

External links and references
 Argentine films of 2007 at the Internet Movie Database

2007
Argentine
Films